Intraflagellar transport protein 74 homolog (IFT74), also known as coiled-coil domain-containing protein 2 (CCDC2) and capillary morphogenesis gene 1 protein (CMG1), is a protein that in humans is encoded by the IFT74 gene.

BCMG1 is upregulated by umbilical vein endothelial cells during capillary morphogenesis.

References

Further reading